Semecarpus auriculatus is a species of plant in the family Anacardiaceae. It is endemic to India. The specific epithet was originally spelt auriculata.

References

auriculatus
Flora of Karnataka
Flora of Kerala
Flora of Tamil Nadu
Near threatened plants
Taxonomy articles created by Polbot